Baía da Babitonga Wildlife Reserve was a proposed wildlife reserve in the state of Santa Catarina, Brazil. The purpose was to research methods of improving sustainable fishing and aquaculture of oysters and mussels; however, the bay is home to a major industrial park and port.
The project encountered resistance from local politicians and business leaders and was shelved.

Location

Its surroundings include the cities of Joinville and São Francisco do Sul.
The bay also has sandy beaches, rocky shores, about 24 islands and tidal flats.
The bay is important for its biodiversity and as the most southern of Brazil's remaining mangrove forests. 
In 2003 the Ministry of the Environment classified it as an area of extreme biological importance.

In 2007 the Chico Mendes Institute for Biodiversity Conservation (ICMBio) estimated that over 2,000 families of fisherfolk used the natural resources in the proposed reserve area for their livelihood. Aquatic farms cultivated mussels and oysters in the bay, and tourism was expanding.
Endangered species such as the Guiana dolphin (Sotalia guianensis), La Plata dolphin (Pontoporia blainvillei) and Atlantic goliath grouper (Epinephelus itajara) depended on the environmental quality of the bay.

The Bay of Babitonga is also an important harbour and the region holds the state's largest industrial park, which depends on use of the port facilities.
The area has been degraded by human occupation over the years.
The water has been polluted by human and industrial waste water, siltation due to deforestation, unsustainable fishing and hunting, landfill in the mangroves and other activities.
By 2007 the shrimp harvest had dropped drastically from earlier years.

Proposal

On 18 November 2006 the Brazilian Institute of Environment and Renewable Natural Resources (IBAMA) announced that it was studying creation of the Bay of Babitonga Wildlife Reserve, and that public consultations would be held in local communities.
The proposed sustainable conservation unit would promote harmonious integration of productive activity in the region with conservation of nature, particularly of land crab, grouper, sea bass, gray dolphin and porpoise.
This would be the first wildlife reserve to be created in Brazil.
The purpose was to promote research that would benefit fishing and shellfish cultivation in the bay.
Activities such as fishing, swimming and sightseeing would be regulated to avoid exceeding the capacity of the environment.
The reserve would cover the mangroves and deep water.
It would not have direct control over dumping of domestic and industrial sewage, but could help find funding for sewage works.

Resistance

Seven public consultations were held in communities around the bay in 2006 and 2007, and another was scheduled by ICMBio with IBAMA in São Francisco do Sul on 2 October 2007.
After the first public hearing a group of politicians and businesspeople raised the alarm, since the proposal threatened planned projects and privatization of large areas of mangroves.
At the 29–30 November 2006 meeting of the National Council of the Environment Sergio Silva of the State of Santa Catarina called for a motion to expand public discussion.
Expansion of the port facilities was going through the environmental review process.
The consultation process had not been widely publicized in the media.

The public meetings were often tense, since many people were against the reserve due to lack of information.
The Business Association of Joinville (ACIJ) took a stand against Ibama, saying there was already sufficient protection of the mangroves and surrounding forests, and treatment of effluents was sufficient.
A delegation led by Governor Luiz Henrique da Silveira met with president Luiz Inácio Lula da Silva (Lula) in Brasilia.
Lula told the Minister of the Environment Marina Silva to cancel the plan.
An injunction was filed in court by trade and industry NGOs to prevent any further action.
As of 2016 Chico Mendes Institute had still not created any wildlife reserves.

Notes

Sources

2007 establishments in Brazil
Protected areas of Santa Catarina (state)
Wildlife reserves of Brazil